Events of the year 2023 in Israel.

Incumbents
 President of Israel – Isaac Herzog
 Prime Minister of Israel – Benjamin Netanyahu
 President of the Supreme Court – Esther Hayut
 Chief of General Staff – Aviv Kochavi
 Government of Israel – Thirty-seventh government of Israel

Events

January
 1 January – The second stage of the reform of Israel's kosher certification system that was scheduled to come into effect allowing the establishment of private kosher certification agencies to issue kosher certification is postponed by the new Shas party Minister of Religious Services, Michael Malchieli.
 3 January – The visit of the Israeli Minister of National Security Itamar Ben-Gvir to the Temple Mount in Jerusalem sparks protests by Palestinians and the condemnation of several Arab countries.
 7 January – Start of the 2023 Israeli anti-Judicial reform protests - Thousands of Israelis protest in Habima square.
 14 January – Over 80,000 Israelis demonstrate in Tel Aviv against the proposed judicial reform by the new government.
 16 January – Herzi Halevi becomes the new IDF chief of staff.
 19 January – The Supreme Court of Israel barres Aryeh Deri from serving in Israel's cabinet due to his previous fraud convictions.
 22 January – Prime minister Benjamin Netanyahu dismisses health and interior minister Aryeh Deri from his cabinet after the Supreme Court ruled that Deri was not allowed to hold a position as a cabinet minister due to his conviction for tax offenses.
 27 January – 2023 East Jerusalem synagogue shooting: Seven Israelis are killed and ten more are injured in a mass shooting at a synagogue in Neve Yaakov, East Jerusalem. The Palestinian perpetrator is killed by police.
28 January – Two Israelis are shot and critically injured by a 13-year-old Palestinian in East Jerusalem. The attacker is shot and injured by one of his victims before being arrested.

March
 1 March – A bill for the death penalty for those who are charged with terrorism offences passes by the Knesset in a preliminary vote of 55-9. The bill was supported and pushed by Itamar Ben-Gvir and Jewish Power party.
 17 March – The Jerusalem Marathon takes place.

Scheduled events 
 31 October – Elections for local councils and authorities are scheduled to take place.

Deaths
 11 January –
 Shimon Baadani, 94, Orthodox rabbi.
 Dan Eytan, 91, architect.

 8 March-
Chaim Topol, 87, actor, singer, and illustrator.

See also 

Timeline of the Israeli–Palestinian conflict in 2023

References

 
Israel
Israel
2020s in Israel
Years of the 21st century in Israel